Proponents and practitioners of various esoteric forms of spirituality and alternative medicine refer to a variety of claimed experiences and phenomena as being due to "energy" or "force" that defy measurement and thus are distinguished from the scientific form of energy.

Claims related to energy therapies are most often anecdotal, rather than being based on repeatable empirical evidence.

There is no scientific evidence for the existence of such energy, and physics educators criticize the use of the term "energy" to describe the ideas as potentially confusing.

History
Concepts such as "life force", "qi" and "élan vital" existed from antiquity. In the 18th century, Franz Mesmer ignited debate with his theory of animal magnetism. Attention to vitalism grew in the 18th and 19th centuries. Interest continued into the 20th century, largely fuelled by adherents of the New Age movement.

As biologists studied embryology and developmental biology, particularly before the discovery of genes, a variety of organisational forces were posited to account for their observations. German biologist Hans Driesch (1867–1941), proposed entelechy, an energy which he believed controlled organic processes. However such ideas are discredited and modern science has all but abandoned the attempt to associate additional energetic properties with life.

It is not the scientific concept of energy that is being referred to in the context of spirituality and alternative medicine. As Brian Dunning writes:

Despite the lack of scientific support, spiritual writers and thinkers have maintained ideas about energy and continue to promote them either as useful allegories or as fact. The field of energy medicine purports to manipulate energy, but there is no credible evidence to support this.

The concept of "qi" (energy) appears throughout traditional East Asian culture, such as in the art of feng shui and Chinese martial arts. Qi philosophy also includes the notion of "negative qi", typically understood as introducing negative moods like outright fear or more moderate expressions like social anxiety or awkwardness. Deflecting this negative qi through geomancy is a preoccupation in feng shui. The traditional explanation of acupuncture states that it works by manipulating the circulation of qi through a network of meridians.

Locations
There are various sacred natural sites that people of various belief systems find numinous or having an "energy" with significance to humans. The idea that some kind of "negative energy" is responsible for creating or attracting ghosts or demons appears in contemporary paranormal culture and beliefs as exemplified in the TV shows Paranormal State and Ghost Hunters.

See also

 Aether (classical element)
 Animal Magnetism
 Ase (Yoruba)
 Aura (paranormal)
 Barakah
 Earth mysteries
 Ectoplasm (paranormal)
 Energy (psychological)
 Kundalini
 Lung (Tibetan Buddhism)
 Mana
 Manitou
 Numen
 Odic force
 Orgone
 Prana
 Qi
 Royal Commission on Animal Magnetism
 Shakti/shaktipat
 Shrine
 Silap Inua
 Vril

References

External links
 

 
Energy and instincts
Pseudoscience
Spirituality
Vitalism
Western esotericism